Bruce McLaughlin (born January 15, 1946) is a Canadian politician. He served as a Member of the Northwest Territories Legislature from 1979 until 1991.

McLaughlin was first elected to the Northwest Territories Legislature in the 1979 Northwest Territories general election. He won the new Pine Point electoral district. McLaughlin was re-elected in the 1983 Northwest Territories general election.
In his second term he was appointed to the cabinet and became Minister of Health and Social Services. He was re-elected to his third and final term in the 1987 Northwest Territories general election. His electoral district was abolished in 1991 after the Pine Point mine shutdown operations and the town was dismantled.

McLaughlin ran as the candidate in the electoral district of Western Arctic for the Progressive Conservative Party of Canada in the 2000 Canadian federal election.

McLaughlin previously served as the Territories representative on the Conservative Party of Canada national council.

References

External links
Conservative Party of Canada National Council

1946 births
Living people
Members of the Legislative Assembly of the Northwest Territories
Politicians from Edmonton